Clostera curtula, the chocolate-tip, is a moth of the family Notodontidae. It was first described by Carl Linnaeus in his 1758 10th edition of Systema Naturae and it is found in Europe ranging to Siberia.

The wingspan is 27–35 mm. The moth flies from April to September depending on the location.

The larvae feed on poplar, primarily Populus tremula, and willow.

External links

Chocolate-tip on UKMoths
Fauna Europaea
Lepiforum e.V.
De Vlinderstichting 

Notodontidae
Moths described in 1758
Moths of Europe
Moths of Asia
Taxa named by Carl Linnaeus